Byggvir is a figure in Norse mythology. The only surviving mention of Byggvir appears in the prose beginning of Lokasenna, and stanzas 55 through 56 of the same poem, where he is referred to as one of Freyr's servants and as the husband of Beyla.

Bygg is the Old Norse word for barley. Subsequently, Byggvir  is often identified with this etymology of his name and connections have been placed with the mentioning of Byggvir's described involvement with mill-grinding as being potential references to barley processing. Comparisons to the Anglo-Saxon figure of Beowa (Old English "barley") have been put forth.

Lokasenna
In Lokasenna, Loki is depicted as degrading Byggvir for being of slight stature and as a gossiper:

Stanza 43:

Stanza 44:

Stanza 45:

Stanza 46:

Interpretation

In relation to Loki's comments in Lokasenna, proposals have been made that Beyla and her husband are personifications of agriculture associated with Freyr: Beyla as the manure that softens the earth and develops the seed, Byggvir as the refuse of the mill, chaff.

See also
John Barleycorn
Corn dolly
Sif

Notes

References

 Bellows, Henry Adams (1936). The Poetic Edda. The American-Scandinavian Foundation
 Bruce, Alexander M. (2002) Scyld and Scef: Expanding the Analogues Routledge 
 Lindow, John (2001). Norse Mythology: A Guide to the Gods, Heroes, Rituals, and Beliefs. Oxford University Press. 
 Thorpe, Benjamin (1851). Northern Mythology Vol. I. London: Edward Lumley

Freyr
Servants in Norse mythology
Personifications in Norse mythology